Queen's Park is an administrative ward in Brighton, England. The population of the ward at the 2011 census was 15,904.

The area lies to the east of the centre of Brighton, north of Kemptown and south-east of Hanover. It is largely made up of Victorian terraced houses, with a smaller number of detached and semi-detached houses, and includes Queen's Park public park. There are also a number of low-rise blocks of modern flats.

St Luke's Church, an Anglican church built in the Early English style, serves the area.  Designed by Sir Arthur Blomfield and constructed between 1881 and 1885, the large flint-walled building has an unusual layout of bays in the north and south aisles of its nave;  Nikolaus Pevsner described this as "curious" and a "disturbing motif".  The church was listed at Grade II in 1999.

References

Wards of Brighton and Hove
Brighton and Hove